The 2017–18 Junior ABA League is the inaugural season of the Junior ABA League with ten men's under-19 teams from Serbia, Croatia, Slovenia, Montenegro, Bosnia and Herzegovina and the Republic of Macedonia participating in it. Teams are the junior selections of the 2017–18 ABA League First Division teams.

Competition
Ten under-19 teams are participating at the 2017–18 Junior ABA League season – Budućnost VOLI, Cedevita, Cibona, Crvena zvezda mts, Igokea, Mega Bemax, Mornar, MZT Skopje Aerodrom, Partizan NIS and Petrol Olimpija - will be divided into two semi-final Groups.

In Group A in Belgrade, Serbia are Crvena zvezda mts, Cibona, Mega Bemax, Mornar and MZT Skopje Aerodrom. In Group B in Zagreb, Croatia are Budućnost VOLI, Cedevita, Igokea, Partizan NIS and Petrol Olimpija. 

In the group stage, all teams will face each other team within a group in a round-robin system. The two best placed teams of each group will advance to the final tournament, which will take place in Laktaši. At the final tournament, the teams will play two games – the semifinal and the final or third place game. The winner of the final tournament will become the 2017–18 ABA Junior Tournament Champion.

Teams

Team allocation

Locations and personnel

Group stage

Group A 
Venue: Basket City Hall, Belgrade, Serbia

Group B 
Venue: Dom košarke Cedevita, Zagreb, Croatia

Final Four
Venue: Laktaši Sports Hall, Laktaši, Bosnia and Herzegovina

Source: Junior Adriatic League

Semifinals

Crvena zvezda U19 v Budućnost VOLI U19

Igokea U19 v Mega Bemax U19

Third place

Final

Awards

See also 
 2017–18 ABA League First Division

References

External links 
 Official website

U19 ABA League Championship
Junior
2017–18 in European basketball leagues
2017–18 in Serbian basketball
2017–18 in Slovenian basketball
2017–18 in Croatian basketball
2017–18 in Bosnia and Herzegovina basketball
2017–18 in Montenegrin basketball
2017–18 in Republic of Macedonia basketball